Duplicity is an album by American jazz saxophonist Lee Konitz and French jazz pianist Martial Solal recorded in 1977 and released on the Italian Horo label.

Track listing 
All compositions by Lee Konitz and Martial Solal unless noted.
 "Duplicity" – 6:58
 "Roman Walkings" (Martial Solal) – 5:28
 "Esselle" (Lee Konitz) – 4:25
 "Words Have Changed" – 18:55
 "November Talk" – 6:35
 "Blues Sketch" – 11:20
 "Rhythm Sweet" – 19:06

Personnel 
 Lee Konitz – alto saxophone
 Martial Solal – piano (tracks 1, 2 & 4–7)

References 

Lee Konitz albums
Martial Solal albums
1978 albums
Horo Records albums